Amen Brown (born ) is an American politician. He is currently a member of the Pennsylvania House of Representatives, represnting the 10th District since 2023. Brown previously represented the 190th District from 2021 to 2022 before redistricting moved him to the 10th District.

Early life and education 
Brown was born and raised in West Philadelphia. He grew up in a single parent household with his eight siblings. His mother was addicted to drugs and his father was incarcerated. At age 12, a gunman shot him and a friend in the back near his family home at 56th and Market. In high school, Brown was arrested during a police raid at a corner store. He was in jail for 45 days before the charges of felony drug-dealing were dropped.

After graduating from Overbrook High School, in 2006, he attended the Community College of Philadelphia with the intention of becoming a school principal. He left college early to pursue his business career.

Business career 
At age 22, Brown co-founded the Education Nation Learning Academy, a child care facility in Frankford. A few years later, he opened a second facility. Brown left the partnership and founded the Overbrook Beacon Community Center in Overbrook.

Brown is the founder and CEO of Overbrook Beacon Community Empowerment. He has also worked as the coordinator for the University of Pennsylvania Sayre Community School Beacon.

Political career
In March 2019, Brown ran in the special election held to fill the 190th state house seat vacated after Vanessa L. Brown resigned. He ran as a member of the Amen Brown Party and won 20% of the vote in a four-way race, losing to Democrat Movita Johnson-Harrell.

State Representative
In June 2020, Brown ran as a Democrat, defeating incumbent G. Roni Green in the Democratic primary, winning by just 600 votes. He campaigned during the COVID-19 pandemic by delivering masks and hand sanitizer.

Brown was elected to the Pennsylvania House of Representatives in November 2020, winning 95% of the vote and defeating Republican Wanda Logan.

Following redistricting in 2021, Brown successfully ran for the 10th District seat. This was despite a attempt to have Brown removed from the primary ballot after it was reveled Brown failed to properly fill out a required list of financial interests. Brown's name was allowed to remain on the ballot, though a judge did chastise Brown for displaying “an ignorance and shocking lack of care of the law.”

2023 Philadelphia mayoral election
The Philadelphia Inquirer reported on December 5, 2022, Brown was planning to declare his candidacy as a Democratic candidate for the 2023 Philadelphia mayoral election. He announced his candidacy on December 16, 2022. His platform is centered around fighting crime and improving the city's standard of living.

Political positions 
The Philadelphia Inquirer has labeled Brown as a "centrist" or "moderate" Democrat.

Criminal justice and policing
According to Axios, Brown is known for being hard on crime, and has pushed for mandatory minimum sentences. He angered progressive members from the Democratic Party after pushing for mandatory minimums for gun-related crimes.
During the 2021–2022 Pennsylvania State House session, Brown introduced House Bill 1587, which would increase and add new mandatory minimum sentencing requirements and deny bail under some circumstances. It was co-sponsored by representatives from both the Republican and Democratic parties. However, some Democratic representatives later dropped their support.

Brown has argued for more policing to "provide much needed support in Philadelphia in addressing [the] gun violence crisis." He has called on Pennsylvania Governor Tom Wolf to deploy the Pennsylvania National Guard to help police the streets of Philadelphia.

Brown has been critical of Philadelphia District Attorney Larry Krasner. He also sat on the State House committee that investigated Krasner for potential impeachable offenses. Brown was absent when the House impeached Krasner.

Education
Brown supports charter school. PACs linked to Jeff Yass, a businessman, who supports school choice, have given Brown at least $62,500 since the start of 2021, which is roughly 40% of his total donations of his state house campaign in that same time period. Brown was the only Democrat in the State House to vote for a bill that would have created a voucher program for children attending schools that have low cumulative test scores, though he later rescinded his support.

Illegal dirt bikes and ATVs
He has been outspoken in his opposition to illegal dirt bikes and ATVs on the streets of Philadelphia. He has said that they terrorize pedestrians, drive recklessly and cause noise pollution. Brown has called for legislation to be passed that will permit the police to capture and destroy illegal dirt bikes.

LGTBQ+ Rights
Brown is a supporter of LGBTQ+ rights. As a member of the Pennsylvania State House, he voted against legislation that would require transgender youth to use the bathrooms of their assigned gender. He expressed support for gender affirming care conducted at the Children's Hospital of Philadelphia.

Personal life
Brown has two children.

In 2014, Brown was implicated in deed fraud when he purchased a property at 2312 Reed Street for $15,000 cash from owner Norman Johnson who had been deceased for over a decade. Johnson's rightful heirs reacquired the property in court after a judge nullified the forged deed. He faced criminal charges, which were eventually dropped. Brown defended his actions saying he was a victim of a Craigslist scam. 

A year later, Brown was sued for $26,000 in a breach of contract lawsuit. Brown signed a contract to renovate a house in North Philadelphia but "completely failed to perform certain aspects of the work or performed the work negligently" according to the lawsuit. In 2021, the City of Philadelphia sued Brown for $30,000 in unpaid taxes and liens.

In a 2023 article in The Philadelphia Inquirer, Jeffrey Brooks Jr., a former business associate of Brown, accused him of only paying back $23,000 of a $50,000 loan.

References 

|-

African-American state legislators in Pennsylvania
Living people
People from Philadelphia
Politicians from Philadelphia
Democratic Party members of the Pennsylvania House of Representatives
Community College of Philadelphia alumni
21st-century American politicians
21st-century African-American politicians
1987 births